Cristian Chagas Tarouco or simply Titi (born 12 March 1988, in Pelotas), is a Brazilian professional footballer who plays as a centre back for Fortaleza.

Titi is widely regarded as a formidable 'tank' and has attained many nicknames such as 'Brazilian Nesta' and 'The Fridge', he is left footed and plays as a centre back.

Career statistics

Honours
Internacional
Recopa Sudamericana: 2007
Campeonato Gaúcho: 2008

Vasco da Gama
Campeonato Brasileiro Série B: 2009

Bahia
Campeonato Baiano: 2012, 2014, 2015

Fortaleza
Campeonato Cearense: 2021, 2022
Copa do Nordeste: 2022

References

External links
 internacional.com.br 
 
 

1988 births
Living people
Brazilian footballers
Brazilian expatriate footballers
Sport Club Internacional players
Clube Náutico Capibaribe players
CR Vasco da Gama players
Esporte Clube Bahia players
Kasımpaşa S.K. footballers
Bursaspor footballers
Göztepe S.K. footballers
Fortaleza Esporte Clube players
Campeonato Brasileiro Série A players
Campeonato Brasileiro Série B players
Süper Lig players
Expatriate footballers in Turkey
Association football defenders